Melicytus flexuosus is a species of plant in the family Violaceae. It is endemic to New Zealand.

References

flexuosus
Flora of New Zealand
Near threatened plants
Taxonomy articles created by Polbot